Ian Vermaak (born 28 March 1933) is a former tennis player competing for South Africa. As the No. 4 seed he finished runner-up to Nicola Pietrangeli in the singles final of the Amateur French Championships of Roland-Garros in 1959, after having reached earlier in the season the Hamburg International German Tennis Championships final, losing to William Knight.

His best result at the Wimbledon Championships was in 1960 when he reached the fourth round in the singles event which he lost in five sets to Ramanathan Krishnan.

Vermaak competed for the South African Davis Cup team in six ties between 1953 and 1960 and compiled a record of five wins and seven losses. In 1956 he won the singles title of the South African Championships, defeating Torsten Johansson in the final in fives sets. In 1959 he defeated his countryman Ray Weedon in the final of the 71st Southampton Grass Court Championships on Long Island, New York.

Vermaak was ranked World No. 10 by Lance Tingay of The Daily Telegraph in 1959.

Grand Slam finals

Singles: (1 runner-up)

References

External links
 
 
 

South African male tennis players
People from Empangeni
1933 births
Living people
White South African people